The Napa Valley Railroad Company was the company which operated the railroad in the Napa Valley from 1864 until 1869.

References

Napa Valley
Transportation in Napa County, California
1860s in California
History of Napa County, California